Various sour soups,  characterized by their sour taste, are known in various East Asian, Southeast Asian, and Slavic cuisines.

Asian origin

Samlar machu, a Khmer term for a category of sour soups.
Canh chua (literally "sour soup")  is a sour soup indigenous to the Mekong River region of southern Vietnam.
Sinigang, Philippine sour soup
Hot and sour soup
Tom kha kai
Tom yum
Lemon rasam - an Indian sour soup made with lemon juices
Dunt dalun chin-yei - drumstick sour soup (cuisine of Burma)
Sayur asem
Ikan kuah kuning - an Indonesia sour fish soup

Slavic origin

 Borscht cooked in Eastern Europe has appreciable sour taste due to adding (sour) tomatoes, sour beet (or fermented beet juice) and sour cream.
 Kapusniak, Ukrainian and Polish soup made from sour cabbage (sauerkraut), millet and potatoes in meat broth
 Sour shchi, a sour cabbage soup in Russian cuisine
 Rassolnik, traditional Russian soup made with pickled cucumbers
 Sorrel soup
 Solyanka, thick, spicy and sour soup in the Russian and Ukrainian cuisine
 Okroshka, cold Russian soup traditionally made with kvass
 Sour rye soup, known as żur in Belarus and Poland, or kyselo in Slovakia and the Czech Republic.
 Jota (Slovenian cuisine)
 Styrian sour soup (Slovenian cuisine)
 Vipava sour soup (Slovenian cuisine)

Romania and Moldova
Borș, term from the historic region of Moldavia for sour soups or fermented wheat bran, essential ingredient to cook Ciorbă.

See also
 List of soups

 
Soup-related lists
Sour foods